Whitney Lynn Hedgepeth (born March 19, 1971) is an American former competition swimmer who won a gold and two silver medals at the 1996 Summer Olympics.

Hedgepeth was born in Charlottesville, Virginia. She reached the Olympic level as a swimmer for the Virginia Association for Competitive Swimming (VACS) under coach Dudley Duncan.  Many Virginia Swimming LSC Records remain hers, over two decades later.

Hedgepeth initially attended the University of Florida in Gainesville, Florida, where she competed for coach Randy Reese's Florida Gators swimming and diving team in 1989–90.  As a Gator swimmer, she won two NCAA national championships: the individual 200-meter freestyle, and as a member of the Gators' winning team in the 4×100-meter medley relay.  She received seven All-American honors from her performance at the 1990 NCAA championships.  Following her freshman year, she transferred to the University of Texas in Austin, Texas, and finished her NCAA career swimming for coach Jill Sterkel's Texas Longhorns swimming and diving team from 1992 to 1994.  As a Texas Longhorn swimmer, she won three more NCAA national championships and received another twenty All-American honors, for a career total of twenty-seven.

She competed in the 200-meter individual medley at the 1988 Summer Olympics in Seoul, South Korea, finishing eighth in the final.  At the 1996 Summer Olympics in Atlanta, Georgia, Hedgepeth won individual silver medals in the 100-meter backstroke and 200-meter backstroke events, and a gold medal as a member of the winning U.S. relay team in the women's 4×100-meter medley relay event.

Hedgepeth retired from competition swimming after the Atlanta Games, and became a swimming coach with Longhorn Aquatics in Austin.  Since 2005, she was the masters' coach of the Longhorn Aquatics program.  In 2013, she was honored as the Speedo U.S. Masters Swimming Coach of the Year.

She was inducted into the University of Texas' Longhorns Hall of Honor in 2007.

In 2010, Hedgepeth was inducted into the Virginia Sports Hall of Fame.

Hedgepeth's daughter, Dakota Luther, swam at the 2017 World Aquatics Championships, and placed 15th in the 200 m butterfly.

See also 
 List of Olympic medalists in swimming (women)
 List of University of Texas at Austin alumni
 List of World Aquatics Championships medalists in swimming (women)

References

External links

1971 births
Living people
American female backstroke swimmers
American female freestyle swimmers
American swimming coaches
College swimming coaches in the United States
Florida Gators women's swimmers
Olympic gold medalists for the United States in swimming
Olympic silver medalists for the United States in swimming
People from Colonial Heights, Virginia
Swimmers at the 1987 Pan American Games
Swimmers at the 1988 Summer Olympics
Swimmers at the 1996 Summer Olympics
Texas Longhorns women's swimmers
World Aquatics Championships medalists in swimming
Medalists at the 1996 Summer Olympics
Pan American Games gold medalists for the United States
Pan American Games silver medalists for the United States
Pan American Games medalists in swimming
Universiade medalists in swimming
Universiade gold medalists for the United States
Universiade silver medalists for the United States
Universiade bronze medalists for the United States
Medalists at the 1987 Pan American Games